Sabinsville is an unincorporated community, located in Clymer Township, in Tioga County, Pennsylvania, United States. The zipcode is: 16943.

References

Unincorporated communities in Tioga County, Pennsylvania
Unincorporated communities in Pennsylvania